The Canton of Le Sel-de-Bretagne is a former canton of France, in the Ille-et-Vilaine département, located in the south of the department. It was disbanded following the French canton reorganisation which came into effect in March 2015. It consisted of 8 communes, and its population was 7,255 in 2012.

References

Sel-de-Bretagne
2015 disestablishments in France
States and territories disestablished in 2015
Brittany region articles needing translation from French Wikipedia